This is a list of towns in the British Virgin Islands, there are no cities in the British Virgin Islands. The capital, and the largest town is Road Town, and Spanish Town is the second largest town. The main island is Tortola, where most of the towns are.

These are the settlements of the British Virgin Islands:
 Belmont
 Creek Village
 East End-Long Look
 Great Harbour
 Great Harbour
 Kingstown
 Long Look Estate
 Peter Island Resort
 Road Town
 Spanish Town
 The Settlement
 West End

External links

Populated places in the British Virgin Islands
British Virgin Islands-related lists